Stigmella aurella is a moth of the family Nepticulidae. It is found in Europe from Ireland to Ukraine, the Near East, and the eastern part of the Palearctic realm.

Description
The head is ferruginous to orange. Antennal eyecaps ochreous-whitish. Forewings shining copper gold ; a shining pale golden fascia beyond middle, preceded by a purplish or dark purple-fuscous fascia, apical area beyond this dark purple to fuscous. Hindwings rather dark grey. Adults are on wing in May and later in the summer.

The larvae feed on Agrimonia eupatoria, Agrimonia procera, Aremonia agrimonoides, Fragaria moschata, Fragaria vesca, Fragaria viridis, Geum rivale, Geum urbanum, Rubus caesius, Rubus dumetorum, Rubus fruticosus, Rubus idaeus, Rubus plicatus, Rubus sanguineus, Rubus saxatilis and Rubus ulmifolius. They mine the leaves of their host plant. The mine consists of corridor which does not widened at the end.

References

External links
 Stigmella aurella images at Consortium for the Barcode of Life
 

Nepticulidae
Fauna of Norfolk Island
Leaf miners
Moths described in 1775
Moths of Asia
Moths of Europe
Taxa named by Johan Christian Fabricius